William Edward Trent (1874 - 1948) was a British architect.

Early life
His cousin was the sculptor and medallist Newbury Abbot Trent.

Career
Together with Henry Poston, to whom he was apprenticed, and then his assistant, he was the architect for the Earl of Essex, a Grade II listed public house at 616 Romford Road, Manor Park, London, built in 1902.

Having been articled to Henry Poston of Lombard Street, London in 1892, he remained with Poston as his assistant until he started an independent practice in London in 1905.

From 1909, Trent specialised in cinema design. This led to his appointment first as the chief architect to Provincial Cinematograph Theatres (PCT), and then as architect to the Gaumont British Picture Corporation, which took over PCT in 1929. These cinemas/theatres included the Regent Theatre, Ipswich, Apollo Victoria Theatre and the Gaumont Finchley (1937), designed with the assistance of his son W. Sydney Trent and R. Golding.

Personal life
His son William Sydney Trent (1903-1944) was also an architect. When his father became a full-time employee of PCT, his son took over his private practice, retaining him as a consultant. However, he joined Gaumont British in 1932 to help his father with the huge increase in work with the advent of talking pictures.

References

External links 

Public house architects
1874 births
1948 deaths
Architects from London